Exploration Place is a science museum located on the west side of the Arkansas River in the Delano neighborhood of Wichita, Kansas, United States.  It is a 501(c)(3) not-for-profit institution.

History
During the 1980s, a plan to consolidate the city-owned Wichita Omnisphere and Science Center and the Children's Museum of Wichita was proposed. In 1992, a capital funds campaign was launched, and with an endowment from Velma Lunt Wallace, funds from the City of Wichita and Sedgwick County, and other donations, the museum opened in the spring of 2000.

The museum is supported by admissions, membership dues, Sedgwick County government, and other public support and voluntary contributions from individuals, corporations and foundations.  In 2019 Exploration Place had attendance of 345,838, made up of 279,640 people visiting the facility and 66,198 people engaged through outreach programs.

Building
Construction began May 1997 and took 2 ½ years. Internationally acclaimed architect Moshe Safdie of Boston designed the building. The combined distance around the interior perimeter of both buildings is approximately one mile.

The "Island Building" is named because it is surrounded by water, with the Arkansas River on one side and the reflecting pond on the other. The reflecting pond is between the buildings to create the illusion that looks like the river runs between the buildings. The reflecting pond is one to three feet deep. Even though the building is so close to the river it is not prone to flooding because it is above the 100-year flood level.

Digital Dome Theater and Planetarium
This venue is the largest dome theater in Kansas with a 60-foot high, 360-degree screen.  It shows digital films.  General museum admission is not required to see a show at the dome.

Kemper Creative Learning Studio
This venue is a 140-seat theater equipped with audio/visual equipment, sound system, podium and stage lighting. It is the home of live science shows.

Exhibits

 Health Inside Out - a hub of discovery, fascination and respect for the human body
 Bridging Art and Science - featuring artists whose work illustrates the important ties between art and science
 Design, Build, Fly - includes flight simulators and a giant "wind wall" made of thousands of tiny reflective discs that show air currents generated by a real airplane propeller and two wind generators mounted on a tower. 
 Explore Kansas - features facts about the state's land, water, weather and inhabitants.  
 Kansas in Miniature - a small-scale recreation of early-1950s Kansas buildings, landmarks and more.
 KEVA: Build Your Mind - features 4 1/2-inch long KEVA Planks and focuses on design aesthetics and engineering. 
 Kansas Kids Connect - an immersive area where young children will discover the world around them and find out how country and city living are more alike than we may think.
Traveling exhibits - an area which has hosted more than 30 different temporary exhibits including Astronaut, A T. rex Named Sue, Titanic: The Artifact Exhibition, CSI: The Experience, and Star Wars:® Where Science Meets Imagination.
 Where Kids Rule - includes a three-story medieval castle where children can experience more than 60 hands-on, STEM-based exhibits.

Explore Store
This 1,900 square-foot shopping extravaganza connects you to science, educational toys and even funky fun! The store is now one of the few places in the area to feature fair trade items. All purchases help support Exploration Place. General museum admission is not required to shop the store.

Outdoors
 Exploration Park - free venue that includes wetlands habitat, adventure play yard, picnic groves and Festival Plaza

Hours and admission

Hours
 Daily 10:00 a.m. to 5 p.m., late opening Thursday until 8 p.m.
 Closed on Thanksgiving Day and Christmas Day.

Museum admission
 Senior (65+) = $10.00
 Adult (12-64) = $12.00
 Youth (3-11) = $10.00
 Children (2 and under) = Free

Dome admission
 Senior (65+) = $7.00
 Adults (12-64) = $8.00
 Youth (3-11) = $6.00
 Children (2 and under) = Free

See also
 Wichita Public Library, main library, is located across the street from Exploration Place

References

External links

 Exploration Place
 360 Tour
 Trip Advisor Reviews

Museums established in 2000
Museums in Wichita, Kansas
Science museums in Kansas
Moshe Safdie buildings